Ightham is a village in Kent, England, located approximately four miles east of Sevenoaks and six miles north of Tonbridge.  The parish includes the hamlet of Ivy Hatch.

Ightham is famous for the nearby medieval manor of Ightham Mote (National Trust), although the village itself is of greater antiquity. Ightham is not mentioned in the Domesday Book, but place-name evidence implies the name is derived from the Saxon 'Ehtaham'. 'Ehta' is a Jutish personal name, while 'ham' means settlement. 

The parish church dates from the 12th century, and in 1336 Edward II granted a request for permission to hold an annual fair in the village.

Ightham was famous for growing Kentish cob nuts. These seem to have been cultivated first by James Usherwood, who lived at Cob Tree Cottage. There was a public house nearby called the Cob Tree Inn, which has now reverted to a private house. There are still a number of cob trees in and around the village, but the work of pruning them and picking the nuts is labour-intensive, and the industry has fallen into decline.the local school has a cobnut as its logo.

Ightham also has its own football team, Ightham FC. Home games are played at the recreation ground adjoining the A25 motorway.
It also has a Scout group 1st Ightam scouts

Demographics 

At the 2001 UK census, the Ightham electoral ward had a population of 1,940. The ethnicity was 99.1% White, 0% Mixed Race, 0.6% Asian, 0.3% Black and 0% Other. The place of birth of residents was 91.9% United Kingdom, 0.5% Republic of Ireland, 2% other Western European countries, and 5.6% elsewhere. Religion was recorded as 82.4% Christian, 0.2% Buddhist, 0% Hindu, 0% Sikh, 0.5% Jewish, and 0.2% Muslim. 11.6% were recorded as having no religion, 0.4% had an alternative religion and 4.7% did not state their religion.

The economic activity of residents aged 16–74 was 38.2% in full-time employment, 11.6% in part-time employment, 14.7% self-employed, 1.9% unemployed, 1.9% students with jobs, 3.5% students without jobs, 13.9% retired, 11.2% looking after home or family, 1.1% permanently sick or disabled and 1.9% economically inactive for other reasons. The industry of employment of residents was 12.3% retail, 9.4% manufacturing, 7.2% construction, 18.3% real estate, 8.2% health and social work, 8.3% education, 4.3% transport and communications, 3.2% public administration, 4.3% hotels and restaurants, 17.9% finance, 1.3% agriculture and 5.3% other. Compared with national figures, the ward had a relatively high proportion of workers in finance and real estate. There were a relatively low proportion in manufacturing, public administration, transport and communications. Of the ward's residents aged 16–74, 35.7% had a higher education qualification or the equivalent, compared with 19.9% nationwide.

Nearest settlements

Notable people
William Sutton (1830 – 1888), recipient of the Victoria Cross
Benjamin Harrison (1837–1921), a grocer who won international recognition as a pioneer in the realm of archaeology. He contended that flints he found in the pre-glacial drift on the North Downs near Ash were artefacts, thus vastly antedating the antiquity of man.
William Lambarde, author of the first English county history, A Perambulation of Kent, married his first wife, Jane, in 1570 at Ightham Church on her 17th birthday. They then lived at the family home of the Manor of St Clere. Jane died on 21 September 1573, but William continued to live at the house for another 10 years.
Lord Eversley (when Mr. George John Shaw-Lefevre), and his wife, Constance, lived at Oldbury Place in Ightham during the time he was Postmaster General.
Anna Lee, MBE (2 January 1913 – 14 May 2004), was a British-born American actress.                                              
Thomas Riversdale Colyer-Fergusson, VC (18 February 1896 – 31 July 1917) was an English recipient of the Victoria Cross.  His Victoria Cross is displayed in the chapel at Ightham Mote.
 William Tomkin (25 November 1860 – 7 April 1940), British watercolour artist, draughtsman and Assistant to General Augustus Pitt Rivers. Along with other family members he is buried in the village churchyard.
 Martina Cole (born 30 March 1959), novelist. Has lived in the village since 2005.
Len Goodman - TV presenter
Roger K. Furse - (1903-1972) - costume designer

References

External links

Ightham Community website
Ightham Community website

Villages in Kent